Midshipman (foaled March 26, 2006, in Kentucky) is an American Thoroughbred racehorse.

Owned by Stonerside Stable and trained by Hall of Famer Bob Baffert, as a two-year-old Midshipman won 3 of 4 starts, including the Breeders' Cup Juvenile and Del Mar Futurity.

Two weeks before his run in the Breeders' Cup, Midshipman was sold to Darley Stable and as part of the sales agreement was transferred to trainer Saeed bin Suroor after the race.

The colt was a leading contender for the 2009 Triple Crown but fell off due to a 'soft tissue injury.'

Midshipman made his 3-year-old debut in an allowance optional claiming race on Sept 18 at Belmont Park, which marked his first start on traditional dirt.  He won by 3 lengths over co-favorite Just Ben.

Midshipman also ran in 2009's Breeders' Cup Dirt Mile, where he finished 3rd to the longest shot in the race, Farthest Land.

Race record

References
 
 

2006 racehorse births
Racehorses bred in Kentucky
Racehorses trained in the United States
Breeders' Cup Juvenile winners
Thoroughbred family 16-g